Fayette County Schools is a public school district in Fayette County, West Virginia. Its offices are located in the county seat of Fayetteville.

Board of Education
Fayette County Schools is under the supervision of the elected Fayette County Board of Education, made up of the following members,
James P. Gray, President
Stephen G. Slockett, Vice President
Cindy Whitlock
Gary Ray
Joseph Groom

Schools

High Schools
Meadow Bridge High School, Meadow Bridge
Midland Trail High School, Hico
Oak Hill High School, Oak Hill

Middle Schools
Oak Hill Middle School, Oak Hill

Intermediate Schools
New River Intermediate School, Oak Hill

Elementary/Middle Schools
Fayetteville PK-8, Fayetteville
Valley PK-8, Smithers

Elementary Schools
Ansted Elementary School, Ansted
Divide Elementary School, Lookout
Meadow Bridge Elementary, Meadow Bridge
New River Primary School, Oak Hill

Vocational Schools
Fayette Institute of Technology, Oak Hill

Former Schools
Beckwith Elementary School
Danese Elementary School
Fayetteville Elementary School
Gatewood Elementary School
Gauley Bridge Elementary
Mount Hope Elementary
Oak Hill Elementary
Oak Hill East End Elementary School
Page Elementary School
Pax Elementary School
Powellton Elementary School
Rosedale Elementary School
Scarbro Elementary School
Valley Elementary School
New River Elementary
Ansted Middle School
Fayetteville Middle School
Montgomery Middle School
Mount Hope Middle School
Nutall Middle School
Fayetteville High School
Gauley Bridge High School
Mount Hope High School
Valley High School

References

External links
 Official Website

School districts in West Virginia
Education in Fayette County, West Virginia